Kentucky Route 192 (KY 192) is a  state highway in the U.S. state of Kentucky. The highway connects the Somerset area and the London areas with mostly rural areas of Pulaski and Laurel counties.

Route description

Pulaski County
KY 192 begins at an intersection with KY 80 Bus. (East Mt. Vernon Street/Mt. Victory Road) just east of Somerset, within Pulaski County. It travels to the east and begins to curve to the southeast. It intersects KY 914 It then intersects the southern terminus of KY 692 (Grundy Road). The highway curves to the south and enters Ruth. There, it crosses over Pitman Creek. Almost immediately, it curves to an easterly direction. Then, it intersects the northern terminus of KY 1643 (Colo Road). It curves to the southeast and crosses over Buck Creek and enters Daniel Boone National Forest. Almost immediately, KY 192 curves to the south and southeast. It intersects the northern terminus of KY 3269 (Poplarville Road). It crosses over Mud Lick Branch and enters Mt. Victory. There, it intersects the southern terminus of KY 1003. It winds its way to the east and crosses the Rockcastle River and enter Laurel County.

Laurel County
KY 192 continues to the southeast and skirts along the southern edge of the Cane Creek Wildlife Management Area, where it intersects the northern terminus of KY 1193. It then heads to the northeast. On the eastern edge of the national forest, it intersects the northern terminus of KY 312 (Laurel Lake Road). It then travels along the eastern edge of the forest and intersects the western terminus of KY 552 (West Pine Hill Road). The highway passes Cold Hill Elementary School. At Honeysuckle Lane, it leaves the forest. It intersects the southern terminus of KY 3432 (Parker Road) before passing Wiginton Cemetery and New London Country Club. It intersects the western terminus of KY 3012 (Esquire Road). Almost immediately, it has an interchange with Interstate 75 (I-75) and enters London. The highway intersects KY 1006 (Old Whitley Road/West 5th Street). It curves to the southeast and intersects KY 363 (Keavy Road/Whitley Road). It curves to the northeast and intersects U.S. Route 25 (US 25; South Laurel Road/South Main Street). It immediately crosses over Whitley Branch. The next intersection is with KY 229 (Barbourville Road). It then crosses over some railroad tracks and then intersects KY 80 (Manchester Road). It then meets its eastern terminus, an intersection with the Hal Rogers Parkway.

Major intersections

See also

References

0192
Transportation in Pulaski County, Kentucky
Transportation in Laurel County, Kentucky
London, Kentucky micropolitan area